Menil Mavraides (born 1931) is a former guard for the Philadelphia Eagles football team in 1954 and 1957. With the nickname "Minnie", he was listed at 6' 2" and 220 lbs.

Early years
Mavraides was born November 17, 1931 in Lowell, Massachusetts. He played for the Lowell High School Red Raiders football team under head coach Ray Riddick.

College years
Menil went on to play for Notre Dame from 1950 to 1953.   At Notre Dame he played under head coach Frank Leahy, who was the former line coach for the Seven Blocks of Granite where Learhy coached Menil's high school coach Ray Riddick.  Here, Mavraides played shoulder-to-shoulder with Tackle Art Hunter, Center Jim Schrader, and Fullback Neil Worden as the main blockers for Heisman Trophy winning running back Johnny Lattner.

During His Sophomore Year, Menil was instrumental in helping the Irish beat the 9-0 Rose Bowl bound USC Trojans at home by recovering a late game fumble deep in Trojan territory.

His Senior year, the 1953 Notre Dame finished the season 9-0-1 and was runner up to the National Championship, and had an unprecedented 12 players drafted to '54 NFL.   Menil also finished his college career being ranked #1 in all NCAA with 27pts in kick scoring.

In the September 13th, 1954 Sports Illustrated article  Herman Hickman describes the 1953 Notre Dame Team by writing;
Frankly, it's hard to see how any squad could lose such men as Halfback Johnny Lattner, Fullback Neil Worden, Tackle Art Hunter, Center Jim Schrader and Guard Menil Mavraides and still be a top-ranked team. Each was on some All-American or other. Lattner, Worden and Hunter were first-round Pro draft choices. Schrader was a second-round choice. Mavraides a third. But Notre Dame is not an ordinary football team, it's Notre Dame... Notre Dame doesn't lose two often.

Before the start of the 1954 NFL season, Mavraideres, joined four of his Fighting Irish classmates, in the 1954 summer classic College All-Star Game, where they lost 31 to 6 to the Detroit Lions in front of 93,000 fans.

Later years

In 1986, Lowell High school inducted Menil Mavraides into the LHS Athletic Hall of Fame.

References

Philadelphia Eagles players
1931 births
Living people
Sportspeople from Lowell, Massachusetts
University of Notre Dame alumni